Cody Rutledge Wilson (born January 31, 1988) is an American gun rights activist, crypto-anarchist. He is a founder and director of Defense Distributed, a non-profit organization that develops and publishes open source gun designs, so-called "wiki weapons", suitable for 3D printing and digital manufacture.  Defense Distributed gained international notoriety in 2013 when it published plans online for the Liberator, the first widely available functioning 3D-printed pistol.

Career

Defense Distributed

In 2012, Wilson and associates at Defense Distributed started the Wiki Weapon Project to raise funds for designing and releasing the files for a 3D printable gun. At the time Wilson was the project's only spokesperson; he called himself "co-founder" and "director."

Learning of Defense Distributed's plans, manufacturer Stratasys threatened legal action and demanded the return of a 3D printer it had leased to Wilson. On September 26, 2012, before the printer was assembled for use, Wilson received an email from Stratasys suggesting he was using the printer "for illegal purposes". Stratasys immediately canceled its lease with Wilson and sent a team to confiscate the printer.

While visiting the office of the ATF in Austin to inquire about legalities related to his project, Wilson was interrogated by the officers there. Six months later, he was issued a Federal Firearms License (FFL) to manufacture and deal.

In May 2013, Wilson successfully test-fired a pistol called "the Liberator" that reportedly was made using a Stratasys Dimension series 3D printer purchased on eBay. After test firing, Wilson released the blueprints of the gun's design online through a Defense Distributed website.  The State Department Office of Defense Trade Controls Compliance demanded that Wilson remove the files, threatening prosecution for violations of the International Traffic in Arms Regulations (ITAR).

In October 2014, Defense Distributed began selling to the public a miniature CNC mill named Ghost Gunner for completing receivers for the AR-15 semi-automatic rifle.
On May 6, 2015, Defense Distributed and the Second Amendment Foundation filed Defense Distributed v. U.S. Dept. of State, a constitutional challenge of the ITAR regime used to control their speech. On July 10, 2018, the State Department offered to settle this lawsuit and Wilson resumed work at DEFCAD.

After his arrest on charges of sexual assault against a minor in September 2018, Wilson resigned from Defense Distributed. After his felony conviction in September 2019, he rejoined Defense Distributed.

Dark Wallet

In 2013, Wilson, along with Amir Taaki, began work on a Bitcoin cryptocurrency wallet called Dark Wallet, a project by which he planned to help anonymize financial transactions. He appeared on behalf of the Dark Wallet project at the SXSW festival in Austin, Texas in 2014.

Bitcoin Foundation

On U.S. election day, November 4, 2014, Wilson announced in an interview that he would stand for election to a seat on the board of directors of the Bitcoin Foundation, with "the sole purpose of destroying the Foundation." And Wilson stated: "I will run on a platform of the complete dissolution of the Bitcoin Foundation and will begin and end every single one of my public statements with that message." Wilson lost the 2015 election to the Bitcoin Foundation Board.

Hatreon

In 2017, Wilson launched Hatreon, an "alt-right version of Patreon", to provide crowdfunding and payment services for groups and individuals banned from platforms such as Kickstarter, Patreon, PayPal, and Stripe. The site attracted notable alt-right and neo-Nazi figures, including Andrew Anglin and Richard B. Spencer. While Wilson said that Hatreon clients included "right-wing women, people of color, and transgender people," Bloomberg News reported that most donations went to white supremacists. According to Hannah Shearer, staff attorney at the Giffords Law Center to Prevent Gun Violence, Hatreon users were inciting violence contrary to Hatreon's terms of service, which forbid illegal activity.

The site claimed to have received about $25,000 a month in donations. Hatreon took a five percent cut of donations. Several months after Hatreon's launch, Visa, the site's payments processor, suspended its financial services. With no means of processing payments, the site became inactive.

Political and economic views

Wilson claims an array of influences from anti-state and libertarian political thinkers, including mutualist theorist Pierre-Joseph Proudhon, paleolibertarian anarcho-capitalists such as Austrian School economist Hans-Hermann Hoppe, and classical liberals such as Frederic Bastiat. His political thought has been compared to the "conservative revolutionary" ideas of Ernst Jünger. Jacob Siegel wrote that "Cody Wilson arrives at a place where left, right—and democracy—disappear" and that he oscillates "somewhere between anarch and anarchist."

Wilson is an avowed crypto-anarchist, and has discussed his work in relation to the cypherpunks and Timothy May's vision. He did not vote in the 2016 United States presidential election. He frequently cites the work of post-Marxist thinkers in public comments, especially that of Jean Baudrillard, whom he has claimed as his "master."

Asked during an interview with Popular Science if the Sandy Hook Elementary School shooting affected his thinking or plans in any way, Wilson responded, "... understanding that rights and civil liberties are something that we protect is also understanding that they have consequences that are also protected, or tolerated. The exercise of civil liberties is antithetical to the idea of a completely totalizing state. That's just the way it is."Wilson is generally opposed to intellectual property rights. He has indicated that although his primary goal is the subversion of state-structures, he also hopes that his contributions may help to dismantle the existing system of capitalist property relations.

In a January 2013 interview with Glenn Beck on the nature of and motivations behind his effort to develop and share gun 3D printable files Wilson said, "That's a real political act, giving you a magazine, telling you that it will never be taken away... That's real politics. That's radical equality. That's what I believe in... I'm just resisting. What am I resisting? I don't know, the collectivization of manufacture? The institutionalization of the human psyche? I'm not sure. But I can tell you one thing: this is a symbol of irreversibility. They can never eradicate the gun from the earth."

 Awards Wireds "Danger Room" named Wilson one of "The 15 Most Dangerous People in the World" in 2012. In 2015 and 2017, Wired named Wilson one of the five most dangerous people on the Internet, and in 2019 named him one of the most dangerous people on the Internet of the decade.

Personal life
Originally from Little Rock, Arkansas, Wilson was student body president at Cabot High School in Cabot, Arkansas before graduating in 2006.

Wilson graduated from the University of Central Arkansas (UCA) with a bachelor's degree in English in 2010, where he had a scholarship. While at UCA, Wilson was a member of Sigma Phi Epsilon fraternity and was elected president of UCA's Student Government Association. He traveled to China with UCA's study-abroad program.

In 2012, he studied at the University of Texas School of Law, but left the university in May 2013 after two years.

2018 arrest
On December 28, 2018, Wilson was indicted for sexual assault after he had a sexual encounter with a minor he met on SugarDaddyMeet, a website that procures younger, adult women forolder men. He was accused of committing a second-degree felony by paying a 16-year old girl $500 for sex in a hotel room in Austin, Texas in August 2018.

Wilson's defense attorney, F. Andino Reynal, said Wilson thought the girl was a consenting adult. SugarDaddyMeet requires users to declare they are at least 18 years old before they can create an account.

When the police issued a warrant for his arrest, Wilson was overseas in Taipei, Taiwan. Wilson was deported by the Taiwanese National Immigration Agency (NIA) and charged with an immigration violation; his passport was revoked by the U.S. government. After he was returned to the U.S. by the United States Marshals Service on September 23, 2018, he was released on $150,000 bond from Harris County Jail in Houston, Texas.

On August 9, 2019, Wilson pleaded guilty to one third-degree felony charge of injury to a child. He was sentenced to seven years probation, required to register as a sex offender, prohibited from having unsupervised contact with minors, and required to attend sex offender therapy. The court also ordered him to complete 475 hours of community service, and pay a $1,200 fine and $4,840 in restitution.

Works

Bibliography

 Come and Take It: The Gun Printer's Guide to Thinking Free. New York: Gallery Books (2016). .

Filmography

As himself
 After Newtown: Guns in America (2013)
 Print the Legend (2014)
 Deep Web (2015)
 No Control (2015)
 The New Radical (2017)

As producer
 TFW NO GF'' (2020) A documentary by Alex Lee Moyer.

References

1988 births
Living people
21st-century American inventors
Activists from Little Rock, Arkansas
Activists from Texas
American anti-capitalists
American gun rights activists
American libertarians
Crypto-anarchists
Firearm designers
People associated with Bitcoin
People from Austin, Texas
People from Cabot, Arkansas
University of Central Arkansas alumni
University of Texas School of Law alumni